The 2004 Strauss Canada Cup of Curling was held January 6–11, 2004, at Sport Mart Place in Kamloops, British Columbia. The winning teams received berths into the 2005 Canadian Olympic Curling Trials, the 2004 Continental Cup of Curling and the 2005 Canada Cup of Curling.

2001 World Champion Colleen Jones and her rink from Halifax won the women's event, defeating Saskatchewan's Sherry Anderson in the final. As Jones had already qualified for the 2005 Olympic Trials, Anderson earned a berth for her team. 

Two-time World Champion Randy Ferbey and his rink from Edmonton won the men's event, defeating Calgary's John Morris in the final. As Ferbey had also already qualified for the Olympic Trials, Morris' team qualified as well. 

The total purse for the event was $180,000, with both the men's and women's champions winning $33,000.

Men's event

Teams
The men's teams were as follows:

* MacDonald replaced regular third Jeff Sharp

Preliminary round
Final standings

Tiebreaker
 Burtnyk 6, Dacey 5

Playoffs

Women's event

Teams
The women's teams were as follows:

Preliminary round
Final standings

Tie breaker
 Jackson 7, Kleibrink 6

Playoffs

References

External links
 2004 Strauss Canada Cup of Curling (Men) - Curling Canada Stats Archive
 2004 Strauss Canada Cup of Curling (Women) - Curling Canada Stats Archive

2004 in British Columbia
Canada Cup (curling)
Sport in Kamloops
2004 in Canadian curling
Curling competitions in British Columbia
January 2004 sports events in Canada